Tephritomyia grisea is a species of tephritid or fruit flies in the genus Tephritomyia of the family Tephritidae.

Distribution
Ethiopia, Kenya.

References

Tephritinae
Insects described in 1934
Diptera of Africa